Benjamin Gerald Bordelon (born April 9, 1974) is a former American football player. He played offensive tackle for the San Diego Chargers in 1997. He played in college for the LSU Tigers football team, where he was a starter for four seasons as an offensive guard and tackle, and earned second-team All-Southeastern Conference honors as a senior in 1996.

Since 2014, Bordelon has been president, chairman, and chief executive officer of Bollinger Shipyards. He has been chief operating officer since 2013 and a board member since 2002. Bordelon is a grandson of Bollinger founder Donald G. Bollinger.

References

External links
 
 Bloomberg.com profile

Living people
1974 births
American football offensive guards
American football offensive tackles
American shipbuilders
LSU Tigers football players
Players of American football from Louisiana
San Diego Chargers players